Founded by Paul St. John in 2011, the Canadian Lacrosse League (CLax) was a men's semi-professional indoor lacrosse league based exclusively in Ontario, Canada. CLax ceased operation on August 31, 2016 after the league's single-entity ownership group, Charlesway Corporation Limited and Rodney 'Demon' Hill, deemed the league's business model to be no longer viable.

Similar to the National Lacrosse League, and unlike other Canadian box lacrosse leagues that play in the summer, CLax played its regular season games in the winter with its playoff games and championship culminating in the early spring. CLax opened its inaugural season with six teams in three cities: Brampton Inferno and Peel Avengers in Brampton, Ontario; the Iroquois Ironmen and Ohsweken Demons in Hagersville, Ontario; and the Durham TurfDogs and Oshawa Machine in Oshawa, Ontario.

History
The league's original intentions were to feature eastern and western leagues. This plan was modified to have multiple Ontario teams and one Quebec location in the first year.

The first three teams announced were franchises in Ohsweken, Peterborough, and Montreal. A Brampton Guardian article listed a team in London. Of the original three, only Oshweken wound up with an actual team in the 2012 season. With only three teams, the league decided two teams should operate in each announced location, leading to the creation of the Iroquois Ironmen, Peel Avengers, and Durham TurfDogs. Rodney Hill operated the two Oshweken teams, but the league owned the other clubs initially.

The inaugural games took place January 7, 2012 starting in Ohsweken. The first game was an 18–11 win for the Brampton Inferno over the hometown Iroquois Ironmen. In the second game, the Peel Avengers defeated the Durham TurfDogs 16–9. To conclude the opening day of league play, the Oshawa Machine played the Ohsweken Demons, losing 13–9.

It was announced on October 3, 2012 that the league would be expanding to three new markets: Barrie, Toronto, and St. Catharines. The Oshawa Machine would be moving to Toronto to become the Toronto Shooting Stars; the Peel Avengers would relocate to St. Catharines and the city of Barrie would be awarded an expansion team. It was also announced that the Durham Turf Dogs would be changing their name to the Oshawa Turf Dogs.

In November 2013, the defending champion Iroquois Ironmen announced that they were ceasing operations and would no longer compete in CLax. That was followed in December with the news of 2013 finalists, Toronto Shooting Stars also folding. The Brampton Inferno would become a touring team based out of Southwestern Ontario called the SouthWest Cyclops for 2014.

Former Teams

Creators' Cup championship history

Major awards

Players

Team and League Officials

Statistical leaders

Team Regular Season Champions

Runners

Goalies

All-star teams

First team

Second team

Rookie

See also 
 Continental Indoor Lacrosse League
 National Lacrosse League
 Major Series Lacrosse
 Western Lacrosse Association

References

External links 

 
2011 establishments in Canada
Professional sports leagues in Canada
Sports leagues established in 2011